, abbreviated IMR or , is a research institute for material sciences in the Tohoku University, Japan. It is one of the most advanced research organization in the world. In 2001, it is ranked as no.1 in the field of material sciences by ISI, Philadelphia .

Outline
The institute is the oldest of the five research institutes of Tohoku University. It was started 90 years ago by the late Professor Kotaro Honda for research on KS steel. In 1987, it was reorganized into its present form, a national collaborative research institute, and designated as a Center of Excellence (COE) for material science.

Its research field is diverse materials as well as metals. As recent creations, new types of materials, including high performance, high quality and multifunctional materials such as amorphous alloys with complex structures, bulk metallic glasses developed from amorphous alloys. And multicomponent intermetallic compounds, quasicrystals, oxides, ceramics, nanostructural controlled metals, semiconductors, crystals for solar cells, biomaterials, organic materials, hydrogen storage alloys, and shaped crystals, etc.

Former institutes
The name of the institute was consequently changed to the present one, Institute for Materials Research (IMR).

April 1, 1916: the 2nd Division of the Provisional Institute of Physical and Chemical Research(東北帝国大学理科大学臨時理化学研究所第2部)
May 21, 1919: the Iron and Steel Research Institute (ISRI)(東北帝国大学附属鉄鋼研究所)
August 8, 1922: the Research Institute for Iron, Steel and Other Metals (RIISOM)(東北帝国大学金属材料研究所, 東北大学金属材料研究所1947)
May 21, 1987: Institute for Materials Research (IMR)

Research results
Refer to this page.

People

Presidents

Researchers
Refer to this page.

Many world-famous researchers have belonged to here. Akihisa Inoue, who was the president of Tohoku University, is well known for his invention, bulk metallic glasses of recent years.

Facilities and laboratories
Refer to this page.

Address
1-1-2-chome, Katahira, Aoba-ku, Sendai, Miyagi 980-8577 JAPAN

See also
Tohoku University
Research Institute of Electronic Communication
Institute of Development, Aging and Cancer

External links
IMR official website

References
Tohoku University website

Tohoku University
Research institutes in Japan
Materials science institutes
1916 establishments in Japan